Amisha Sethi is an Indian author, philanthropist, business leader, actress and a model. She was crowned the winner of Haut Monde Mrs. India Worldwide 2021. Her novel, It Doesn't Hurt To Be Nice, was published by Shristi Publishers in 2015. She acted in the 2022 short film Dronacharya released on Disney+Hotstar and MX Player.

Personal life 

She won the title of Mrs. Glamorous 2019, Bengaluru, and is crowned Haut Monde Mrs. India Worldwide 2021.

Education 
Sethi pursued a bachelor's degree in Science from University of Delhi and a Masters in Business Administration from Amity Business School in 2002. She is also an executive scholar in Marketing and Sales Management from Kellogg School of Management, Northwestern University, USA.

Professional life 
Sethi has been a Marketing and Business Leader in Brand Marketing, Strategy and International Consumer Marketing. She has held the position of CMO global with a start-up based in Vancouver in 2014. She was the Chief Commercial Officer at AirAsia in 2013 and the Director of Brand Marketing Asia at BlackBerry. She worked at BlackBerry from 2006 to 2013. She has also worked at Airtel from 2002 to 2006. She is the Chief Awareness Officer at Black Lotus, a meditation app and was the ex Vice President of Global Marketing at Locus Inc.

She has won number of awards and recognition for her endeavours in Marketing and Business in the Asia Pacific region.

Book 
Sethi is the author of the book It Doesn't Hurt To Be Nice, released in September 2015. and talks about rediscovering life, with comedy, drama, and spirituality. It is a story of a young girl and her hilarious, dramatic and enthralling experiences to understand the ultimate purpose of her life, which is – to be a better human with each passing day. The book has received appreciation and commendation across the country.

The book has been released by Srishti Publishers and was a platform to share the cause of kindness and generosity she believes in.

Awards
 Recognized as the "Young Women Rising Star" at the World Women Leadership Congress 2014
 The Asia Pacific Young Women Achievers Award in 2013, Dubai
 Featured as the Top 50 Most Talented Brand Leaders of India by India greatest/CMO council in 2012
 "Youth Achievers Award" 2012, by CMO council and CNBC for her work in Marketing and brand strategy at BlackBerry
 Indira Marketing Excellence Award 2013
 Received the "Women Leadership Award in Corporate excellence" 2015 by Amity Business School

See also 
 Indian English literature

References 

Living people
Novelists from Gujarat
Indian women novelists
English-language writers from India
21st-century Indian novelists
21st-century Indian women writers
People from Rajkot
Women writers from Gujarat
Year of birth missing (living people)